Volga Svyatoslavich or Volkh Vseslavyevich is a Russian epic hero, a bogatyr, from the Novgorod Republic bylina cycle.

References

Russian folklore characters
Slavic mythology
Characters in Bylina